Closed-circuit television (CCTV), also known as video surveillance, is the use of video cameras to transmit a signal to a specific place, on a limited set of monitors. It differs from broadcast television in that the signal is not openly transmitted, though it may employ point-to-point (P2P), point-to-multipoint (P2MP), or mesh wired or wireless links. Even though almost all video cameras fit this definition, the term is most often applied to those used for surveillance in areas that require additional security or ongoing monitoring (Videotelephony is seldom called "CCTV").

Surveillance of the public using CCTV is common in many areas around the world. Video surveillance has generated significant debate about balancing its use with individuals' right to privacy even when in public.

In industrial plants, CCTV equipment may be used to observe parts of a process from a central control room, especially if the environments observed are dangerous or inaccessible to humans. CCTV systems may operate continuously or only as required to monitor a particular event. A more advanced form of CCTV, using digital video recorders (DVRs), provides recording for possibly many years, with a variety of quality and performance options and extra features (such as motion detection and email alerts). More recently, decentralized IP cameras, perhaps equipped with megapixel sensors, support recording directly to network-attached storage devices, or internal flash for completely stand-alone operation.

By one estimate, there will be approximately 1 billion surveillance cameras in use worldwide by 2021. About 65% of these cameras are installed in Asia. The growth of CCTV has been slowing in recent years. The deployment of this technology has facilitated significant growth in state surveillance, a substantial rise in the methods of advanced social monitoring and control, and a host of crime prevention measures throughout the world.

History 

An early mechanical CCTV system was developed in June 1927 by Russian physicist Léon Theremin (cf. Television in the Soviet Union). Originally requested by the Soviet of Labor and Defense, the system consisted of a manually-operated scanning-transmitting camera and wireless shortwave transmitter and receiver, with a resolution of a hundred lines. Having been commandeered by Kliment Voroshilov, Theremin's CCTV system was demonstrated to Joseph Stalin, Semyon Budyonny, and Sergo Ordzhonikidze, and subsequently installed in the courtyard of the Moscow Kremlin to monitor approaching visitors.

Another early CCTV system was installed by Siemens AG at Test Stand VII in Peenemünde, Nazi Germany in 1942, for observing the launch of V-2 rockets.

In the United States, the first commercial closed-circuit television system became available in 1949, called Vericon. Very little is known about Vericon except it was advertised as not requiring a government permit.

Technology 
The earliest video surveillance systems involved constant monitoring because there was no way to record and store information. The development of reel-to-reel media enabled the recording of surveillance footage. These systems required magnetic tapes to be changed manually, which was a time-consuming, expensive and unreliable process, with the operator having to manually thread the tape from the tape reel through the recorder onto a take-up reel. Due to these shortcomings, video surveillance was not widespread. VCR technology became available in the 1970s, making it easier to record and erase information, and the use of video surveillance became more common.

During the 1990s, digital multiplexing was developed, allowing several cameras to record at once, as well as time lapse and motion-only recording. This saved time and money which then led to an increase in the use of CCTV.

Recently CCTV technology has been enhanced with a shift toward Internet-based products and systems, and other technological developments.

Application 
Closed-circuit television was used as a form of pay-per-view theatre television for sports such as professional boxing and professional wrestling, and from 1964 through 1970, the Indianapolis 500 automobile race. Boxing telecasts were broadcast live to a select number of venues, mostly theaters, where viewers paid for tickets to watch the fight live. The first fight with a closed-circuit telecast was Joe Louis vs. Joe Walcott in 1948. Closed-circuit telecasts peaked in popularity with Muhammad Ali in the 1960s and 1970s, with "The Rumble in the Jungle" fight drawing 50million CCTV viewers worldwide in 1974, and the "Thrilla in Manila" drawing 100million CCTV viewers worldwide in 1975. In 1985, the WrestleMania I professional wrestling show was seen by over one million viewers with this scheme. As late as 1996, the Julio César Chávez vs. Oscar De La Hoya boxing fight had 750,000 viewers. Although closed-circuit television was gradually replaced by pay-per-view home cable television in the 1980s and 1990s, it is still in use today for most awards shows and other events that are transmitted live to most venues but do not air as such on network television, and later re-edited for broadcast.

Marie Van Brittan Brown first pioneered and patented a CCTV home security system, much of the technology of which is still used in home security systems today.

In September 1968, Olean, New York was the first city in the United States to install video cameras along its main business street in an effort to fight crime. Another early appearance was in 1973 in Times Square in New York City. The NYPD installed it to deter crime in the area; however, crime rates did not appear to drop much due to the cameras. Nevertheless, during the 1980s video surveillance began to spread across the country specifically targeting public areas. It was seen as a cheaper way to deter crime compared to increasing the size of the police departments. Some businesses as well, especially those that were prone to theft, began to use video surveillance. From the mid-1990s on, police departments across the country installed an increasing number of cameras in various public spaces including housing projects, schools and public parks departments. CCTV later became common in banks and stores to discourage theft, by recording evidence of criminal activity. In 1997, 3,100 CCTV systems were installed in public housing and residential areas in New York City.

Experiments in the UK during the 1970s and 1980s, including outdoor CCTV in Bournemouth in 1985, led to several larger trial programs later that decade. The first use by local government was in King's Lynn, Norfolk, in 1987.

Uses

Crime prevention 

A 2009 systematic review by researchers from Northeastern University and University of Cambridge used meta-analytic techniques to pool the average effect of CCTV on crime across 41 different studies.

The studies included in the meta-analysis used quasi-experimental evaluation designs that involve before-and-after measures of crime in experimental and control areas. However, several researchers have pointed to methodological problems associated with this research literature. First, researchers have argued that the British car park studies included in the meta-analysis cannot accurately control for the fact that CCTV was introduced simultaneously with a range of other security-related measures. Second, some have noted that, in many of the studies, there may be issues with selection bias since the introduction of CCTV was potentially endogenous to previous crime trends. In particular, the estimated effects may be biased if CCTV is introduced in response to crime trends.

It has been argued that problems of selection bias and endogeneity can be addressed by stronger research designs such as randomized controlled trials and natural experiments. A 2017 review published in Journal of Scandinavian Studies in Criminology and Crime Prevention compiles seven studies that use such research designs. The studies included in the review found that CCTV reduced crime by 24-28% in public streets and urban subway stations. It also found that CCTV could decrease unruly behaviour in football stadiums and theft in supermarkets/mass merchant stores. However, there was no evidence of CCTV having desirable effects in parking facilities or suburban subway stations. Furthermore, the review indicates that CCTV is more effective in preventing property crimes than in violent crimes.

Another question in the effectiveness of CCTV for policing is around uptime of the system; in 2013 City of Philadelphia Auditor found that the $15M system was operational only 32% of the time. There is strong anecdotal evidence that CCTV aids in detection and conviction of offenders; for example, UK police forces routinely seek CCTV recordings after crimes. Moreover, CCTV has played a crucial role in tracing the movements of suspects or victims and is widely regarded by anti-terrorist officers as a fundamental tool in tracking terrorist suspects. Large-scale CCTV installations have played a key part of the defenses against terrorism since the 1970s. Cameras have also been installed on public transport in the hope of deterring crime.

A more open question is whether most CCTV is cost-effective. While low-quality domestic kits are cheap, the professional installation and maintenance of high definition CCTV is expensive. Gill and Spriggs did a Cost-effectiveness analysis (CEA) of CCTV in crime prevention that showed little monetary saving with the installation of CCTV as most of the crimes prevented resulted in little monetary loss. Critics however noted that benefits of non-monetary value cannot be captured in a traditional Cost Effectiveness Analysis and were omitted from their study. A 2008 Report by UK Police Chiefs concluded that only 3% of crimes were solved by CCTV. In London, a Metropolitan Police report showed that in 2008 only one crime was solved per 1000 cameras. In some cases CCTV cameras have become a target of attacks themselves.

Cities such as Manchester in the UK are using DVR-based technology to improve accessibility for crime prevention.

In October 2009, an "Internet Eyes" website was announced which would pay members of the public to view CCTV camera images from their homes and report any crimes they witnessed. The site aimed to add "more eyes" to cameras which might be insufficiently monitored. Civil liberties campaigners criticized the idea as "a distasteful and a worrying development".

In 2013 Oaxaca hired deaf police officers to lip read conversations to uncover criminal conspiracies.

In Singapore, since 2012, thousands of CCTV cameras have helped deter loan sharks, nab litterbugs and stop illegal parking, according to government figures.

Crime solving

CCTV can also be used to help solve crimes. In London alone, six crimes are solved each day on average using CCTV footage.

Body worn 

In recent years, the use of body worn video cameras has been introduced for a number of uses. For example, as a new form of surveillance in law enforcement, with cameras located on a police officer's chest or head.

Traffic flow monitoring

Vehicle traffic

Many cities and motorway networks have extensive traffic-monitoring systems, using closed-circuit television to detect congestion and notice accidents. Many of these cameras however, are owned by private companies and transmit data to drivers' GPS systems.

Highways England has a publicly owned CCTV network of over 3000 Pan-Tilt-Zoom cameras covering the British motorway and trunk road network. These cameras are primarily used to monitor traffic conditions and are not used as speed cameras. With the addition of fixed cameras for the active traffic management system, the number of cameras on the Highways England's CCTV network is likely to increase significantly over the next few years.

The London congestion charge is enforced by cameras positioned at the boundaries of and inside the congestion charge zone, which automatically read the number plates of vehicles that enter the zone. If the driver does not pay the charge then a fine will be imposed. Similar systems are being developed as a means of locating cars reported stolen.

Other surveillance cameras serve as traffic enforcement cameras.

Pedestrian traffic
In Mecca, CCTV cameras are used for monitoring (and thus managing) the flow of crowds.

In the Philippines, barangay San Antonio used CCTV cameras and artificial intelligence software to detect the formation of crowds during an outbreak of a disease. Security personnel were sent whenever a crowd formed at a particular location in the city.

Management of infection

Increasing safety and security in public transport 

On a driver-only operated train CCTV cameras may allow the driver to confirm that people are clear of doors before closing them and starting the train.

A trial by RET in 2011 with facial recognition cameras mounted on trams made sure that people who were banned from them did not sneak on anyway.

Sporting events 
Many sporting events in the United States use CCTV inside the venue, either to display on the stadium or arena's scoreboard, or in the concourse or restroom areas to allow fans to view action outside the seating bowl. The cameras send the feed to a central control center where a producer selects feeds to send to the television monitors that fans can view. CCTV monitors for viewing the event by attendees are often placed in lounges, hallways, and restrooms.
In a trial with CCTV cameras, football club fans no longer needed to identify themselves manually, but could pass freely after being authorized by the facial recognition system.

Employee monitoring 

Organizations use CCTV to monitor the actions of workers. Every action is recorded as an information block with subtitles that explain the performed operation. This helps to track the actions of workers, especially when they are making critical financial transactions, such as correcting or cancelling of a sale, withdrawing money or altering personal information.

Actions which an employer may wish to monitor could include:
 Scanning of goods, selection of goods, introduction of price and quantity;
 Input and output of operators in the system when entering passwords;
 Deleting operations and modifying existing documents;
 Implementation of certain operations, such as financial statements or operations with cash;
 Moving goods, revaluation scrapping and counting;
 Control in the kitchen of fast food restaurants;
 Change of settings, reports and other official functions.

Each of these operations is transmitted with a description, allowing detailed monitoring of all actions of the operator. Some systems allow the user to search for a specific event by time of occurrence and text description, and perform statistical evaluation of operator behaviour. This allows the software to predict deviations from the standard workflow and record only anomalous behaviour.

Use in schools

In the United States, Britain, Canada, Australia and New Zealand, CCTV is widely used in schools due to its success in preventing bullying, vandalism, monitoring visitors and maintaining a record of evidence of a crime. There are some restrictions, cameras not being installed in areas where there is a "reasonable expectation of privacy", such as bathrooms, gym locker areas and private offices (unless consent by the office occupant is given). Cameras are generally acceptable in hallways, parking lots, front offices where students, employees, and parents come and go, gymnasiums, cafeterias, supply rooms and classrooms. Some teachers object to the installation of cameras.

A study of high school students in Israeli schools shows that students' views on CCTV used in school are based on how they think of their teachers, school, and authorities. It also stated that most students do not want CCTV installed inside a classroom.

Use in private homes
Many homeowners choose to install CCTV systems either inside or outside their own homes, sometimes both. CCTV cameras are an effective deterrent to potential intruders as their use increases the risk of identification through the camera footage. If someone scouts through an affluent suburb seeking the easiest house to break into, having an obvious CCTV system, alarm or another security measure, makes the house appear to be a more difficult target so they will likely move on to the next house.

Modern CCTV systems can be monitored through mobile phone apps which allows people to view live footage of their house from anywhere they have internet coverage. Some systems provide motion detection so when movement is detected, an alert can be sent to a phone.

Criminal use 
Criminals may use surveillance cameras to monitor the public. For example, a hidden camera at an ATM can capture people's PINs as they are entered, without their knowledge. The devices are small enough not to be noticed, and are placed where they can monitor the keypad of the machine as people enter their PINs. Images may be transmitted wirelessly to the criminal. Even lawful surveillance cameras sometimes have their data go into the hands of people who have no legal right to receive it.

Use in shopping malls & retail stores 
Theft is a huge concern for many department stores and shopping malls. CCTV helps to protect stores' assets, and ensures the safety of employees and customers. This instills a secure, safe, and inviting experience for visitors.

It is even more important to choose the right camera. A CCTV system must have:
 A high resolution camera to ensure image clarity 
 High-capacity digital storage to ensure 24/7 recording
 The right placement with good lighting

Counter-terrorism 

Material collected by surveillance cameras has been used as a tool in post-event forensics to identify tactics, techniques and perpetrators of terrorist attacks. Furthermore, there are various projects − such as INDECT − that aim to detect suspicious behaviours of individuals and crowds. It has been argued that terrorists won't be deterred by cameras, that terror attacks aren't really the subject of the current use of video surveillance and that terrorists might even see it as an extra channel for propaganda and publication of their acts. In Germany calls for extended video surveillance by the country's main political parties, SPD, CDU and CSU have been dismissed as "little more than a placebo for a subjective feeling of security" by a member of the Left party.

Prevalence

Asia 
About 65% of CCTV cameras in the world are installed in Asia. In Asia, different human activities attracted the use of surveillance camera systems and services, including but not limited to business and related industries, transportation, sports, and care for the environment.

In 2018, China was reported to have a huge surveillance network of over 170 million CCTV cameras with 400 million new cameras expected be installed in the next three years, many of which use facial recognition technology.

In Japan, CCTV cameras are often referred to as "surveillance cameras" or "security cameras". Nikkei Business estimated that the total number of security cameras in Japan is approximately 5 million in 2018.

United States

There were an estimated 30 million surveillance cameras in the United States in 2011. Video surveillance has been common in the United States since the 1990s; for example, one manufacturer reported net earnings of $120 million in 1995. With lower cost and easier installation, sales of home security cameras increased in the early 21st century. Following the September 11 attacks, the use of video surveillance in public places became more common to deter future terrorist attacks. Under the Homeland Security Grant Program, government grants are available for cities to install surveillance camera networks. In 2009, there were an estimated 15,000 CCTV systems in Chicago, many linked to an integrated camera network. New York City's Domain Awareness System has 6,000 video surveillance cameras linked together, there are over 4,000 cameras on the subway system (although nearly half of them do not work), and two-thirds of large apartment and commercial buildings use video surveillance cameras. In Washington, D.C. there are more than 30,000 surveillance cameras in schools, and the Metro has nearly 6,000 cameras in use across the system.

United Kingdom
In the United Kingdom, the vast majority of CCTV cameras are operated not by government bodies, but by private individuals or companies, especially to monitor the interiors of shops and businesses. According to the Freedom of Information Act 2000 requests, the total number of local government operated CCTV cameras was around 52,000 over the entirety of the UK.

An article published in CCTV Image magazine estimated the number of private and local government operated cameras in the United Kingdom was 1.85 million in 2011. The estimate was based on extrapolating from a comprehensive survey of public and private cameras within the Cheshire Constabulary jurisdiction. This works out as an average of one camera for every 32 people in the UK, although the density of cameras varies greatly from place to place. The Cheshire report also claims that the average person on a typical day would be seen by 70 CCTV cameras.

The Cheshire figure is regarded as more dependable than a previous study by Michael McCahill and Clive Norris of UrbanEye published in 2002. Based on a small sample in Putney High Street, McCahill and Norris extrapolated the number of surveillance cameras in Greater London to be around 500,000 and the total number of cameras in the UK to be around 4,200,000. According to their estimate the UK has one camera for every 14 people. Although it has been acknowledged for several years that the methodology behind this figure is flawed, it has been widely quoted. Furthermore, the figure of 500,000 for Greater London is often confused with the figure for the police and local government operated cameras in the City of London, which was about 650 in 2011.

The CCTV User Group estimated that there were around 1.5 million private and local government CCTV cameras in city centres, stations, airports, and major retail areas in the UK.

Research conducted by the Scottish Centre for Crime and Justice Research and based on a survey of all Scottish local authorities, identified that there are over 2,200 public space CCTV cameras in Scotland.

Canada 
Project SCRAM is a policing effort by the Halton Regional Police Service to register and help consumers understand the complex issues of privacy and safety that confront households when dealing with installations of home security systems. "The SCRAM program enables community members to voluntarily identify and register their residential video surveillance equipment through a simple, secure, confidential, online form." It has not been extended to commercial businesses. A wide-ranging effort to provide registration and monitoring of home security and systems. "Security camera registration and monitoring is a community-based crime prevention opportunity and investigative tool that enlists the help of residents and can help prevent crime on three levels. Residential video surveillance cameras can deter criminals from entering the area, can prevent crimes from occurring and help solve crimes by providing valuable evidence to the police."

South Africa 
In South Africa due to the high crime rate CCTV surveillance is widely prevalent but the country has been slow to implement the latest technology e.g. the first IP camera was released in 1996 by Axis Communications but IP cameras didn't arrive in South Africa till 2008. To regulate the number of suppliers in 2001 the Private Security Industry Regulation Act was passed requiring all security companies to be registered with the Private Security Industry Regulatory Authority (PSIRA).

Latin America
In Latin America, the CCTV market is growing rapidly with the increase of property crime. Installation of CCTV camera is increasing day by day and the crime is somewhat controlled.

Russia

The number of CCTV cameras equipped with facial biometrics in Moscow's public surveillance network is set to grow by 70 times from the current 1,500 to 105,000 by the end of the year. The CCTV system in Moscow can now recognize faces using an algorithm based on neural networks. City camera recordings are analyzed in real-time. Faces on the screen are scanned and can be checked against several databases, such as the police database, to identify a suspect. This analytical system can also help police recreate a suspect's movements around the city. The system searches for related recordings from various CCTV cameras and identifies the same face from several sightings. The Moscow network includes 160,000 CCTV cameras and 95 percent of residential buildings. By the end of the year, residents will be able to install CCTV cameras on private buildings themselves while connecting them to the unified video observation system. This year, over 3,500 cameras have been connected to the General Centre for Data Storage and Processing. This includes cameras in entrance halls, schools and kindergartens, at MCC stations, stadiums, public transport stops and bus terminals, and in parks. Video recordings are used to solve 70 percent of offenses and crimes. The cameras also help monitor utility services. A department spokesperson added that Moscow has one of the largest security systems in the world with such a comprehensive identification system

Privacy 

Proponents of CCTV cameras argue that cameras are effective at deterring and solving crime, and that appropriate regulation and legal restrictions on surveillance of public spaces can provide sufficient protections so that an individual's right to privacy can reasonably be weighed against the benefits of surveillance. However, anti-surveillance activists have held that there is a right to privacy in public areas. Furthermore, while it is true that there may be scenarios wherein a person's right to public privacy can be both reasonably and justifiably compromised, some scholars have argued that such situations are so rare as to not sufficiently warrant the frequent compromising of public privacy rights that occurs in regions with widespread CCTV surveillance. For example, in her book Setting the Watch: Privacy and the Ethics of CCTV Surveillance, Beatrice von Silva-Tarouca Larsen argues that CCTV surveillance is ethically permissible only in "certain restrictively defined situations", such as when a specific location has a "comprehensively documented and significant criminal threat".

In the United States, the Constitution does not explicitly include the right to privacy although the Supreme Court has said several of the amendments to the Constitution implicitly grant this right. Access to video surveillance recordings may require a judge's writ, which is readily available. However, there is little legislation and regulation specific to video surveillance.

All countries in the European Union are signatories to the European Convention on Human Rights which protects individual rights including the right to privacy. The EU's Data Protection Directive regulates access to personal data including CCTV recordings. This directive is translated into the national law of each country within the European Union.

In the United Kingdom the Data Protection Act 1998 imposes legal restrictions on the uses of CCTV recordings and mandates the registration of CCTV systems with the Data Protection Agency. In 2004, the successor to the Data Protection Agency, the Information Commissioner's Office clarified that this required registration of all CCTV systems with the Commissioner, and prompt deletion of archived recordings. However, subsequent case law (Durant vs. FSA) limited the scope of the protection provided by this law, and not all CCTV systems are currently regulated.

A 2007 report by the UK Information Commissioner's Office, highlighted the need for the public to be made more aware of the growing use of surveillance and the potential impact on civil liberties. In the same year, a campaign group claimed the majority of CCTV cameras in the UK are operated illegally or are in breach of privacy guidelines. In response, the Information Commissioner's Office rebutted the claim and added that any reported abuses of the Data Protection Act are swiftly investigated. Even if there are some concerns arising from the use of CCTV such as involving privacy, more commercial establishments are still installing CCTV systems in the UK.

In 2012, the UK government enacted the Protection of Freedoms Act which includes several provisions related to controlling and restricting the collection, storage, retention, and use of information about individuals. Under this Act, the Home Office published a code of practice in 2013 for the use of surveillance cameras by government and local authorities. The aim of the code is to help ensure their use is "characterised as surveillance by consent, and such consent on the part of the community must be informed consent and not assumed by a system operator. Surveillance by consent should be regarded as analogous to policing by consent."

In Canada, the use of video surveillance has grown very rapidly. In Ontario, both the municipal and provincial versions of the Freedom of Information and Protection of Privacy Act outline very specific guidelines that control how images and information can be gathered by this method and or released.

In Sweden, the use of CCTV in public spaces is regulated both nationally and via GDPR (the European privacy act). The national legislation requires permits for public operators (except for law-enforcement agencies since 1 January 2020) to install CCTV in spaces that allow access to the general public. In an opinion poll commissioned by Lund University in August 2017, the general public of Sweden were asked to choose one measure that would ensure their need for privacy when subject to CCTV-operation in public spaces: 43% favored regulation in the form of clear routines for managing, storing and distributing image material generated from surveillance cameras, 39% favored regulation in the form of clear signage informing that camera surveillance in public spaces is present, 2% favored regulation in the form of having permits restricting the use of surveillance cameras during certain times of day/week, 10% favored regulation in the form of having restrictive policies for issuing permits for surveillance cameras in public spaces, and 6% were unsure or did not know.

Technological developments

Computer-controlled analytics and identification 
Computer-controlled cameras can identify, track, and categorize objects in their field of view.

Video content analysis, also referred to as video analytics, is the capability of automatically analyzing video to detect and determine temporal events not based on a single image, but rather object classification. In the last decade, improved VCA features have been developed. Beyond recognizing specific shapes and colors, VCA applications now can analyze more complex scenarios.

Advanced VCA applications can accurately classify object types based on their shape and motion behavior and they can also measure object speed. Some video analytics applications can be used to virtually apply rules to designated areas. These rules can relate to access control. For example, they can describe which objects can enter into a specific area, when they are allowed to enter or within what circumstances. Virtually applied rules can also relate to various motion situations. VCA based CCTV systems can be set to detect anomalies in a crowd, for instance a person moving in the opposite direction in which they are normally expected (e.g. debarking from a plane at an airport or exiting through an entrance in a subway).

There are different approaches to implementing VCA technology. Data may be processed on the camera itself (edge processing) or by a centralized server. Both approaches have their pros and cons.

To many, the development of CCTV in public areas, linked to computer databases of people's pictures and identity, presents a serious breach of civil liberties. Critics fear such technology will lead to the loss of anonymity in public places.

Retention, storage and preservation 
There is a cost in the retention of the images produced by CCTV systems. The amount and quality of data stored on storage media is subject to compression ratios, images stored per second, image size and is affected by the retention period of the videos or images. DVRs store images in a variety of proprietary file formats. Recordings may be retained for a preset amount of time and then automatically archived, overwritten or deleted, the period being determined by the organisation that generated them.

IP cameras 

A growing branch in CCTV is internet protocol cameras (IP cameras). It is estimated that 2014 was the first year that IP cameras outsold analog cameras. IP cameras use the Internet Protocol (IP) used by most Local Area Networks (LANs) to transmit video across data networks in digital form. IP can optionally be transmitted across the public internet, allowing users to view their cameras remotely on a computer or phone via an internet connection. For professional or public infrastructure security applications, IP video is restricted to within a private network or VPN. IP cameras are considered part of the Internet of Things (IoT) and have many of the same benefits and security risks as other IP-enabled devices.

Main types of IP cameras include: fixed cameras, pan-tilt-zoom (PTZ) cameras and multi-sensor cameras. Fixed cameras' resolution can vary based on the application area, but typically does not exceed 20 MP. The main feature of a PTZ is its remote directional and optical zoom capability. With multi-sensor cameras, wider areas can be monitored and hundreds of megapixel resolution can be achieved.

Industrial video surveillance systems use network video recorders to support IP cameras. These devices are responsible for the recording, storage, video stream processing and alarm management.

Since 2008, IP video surveillance manufacturers can use a standardized network interface (ONVIF) to support compatibility between systems.

Networking CCTV cameras 
The city of Chicago operates a networked video surveillance system which combines CCTV video feeds of government agencies with those of the private sector, installed in city buses, businesses, public schools, subway stations, housing projects etc. Even homeowners are able to contribute footage. It is estimated to incorporate the video feeds of a total of 15,000 cameras.

The system is used by Chicago's Office of Emergency Management in case of an emergency call: it detects the caller's location and instantly displays the real-time video feed of the nearest security camera to the operator, not requiring any user intervention. While the system is far too vast to allow complete real-time monitoring, it stores the video data for use as evidence in criminal cases.

Wireless security cameras 

Many consumers are turning to wireless security cameras for home surveillance. Wireless cameras do not require a video cable for video/audio transmission, simply a cable for power. Wireless cameras are also easy and inexpensive to install but lack the reliability of hard-wired cameras. Previous generations of wireless security cameras relied on analogue technology; modern wireless cameras use digital technology which delivers crisper audio, sharper video, and a secure and interference-free signal.

Talking CCTV 

In Wiltshire, UK, 2003, a pilot scheme for what is now known as "Talking CCTV" was put into action; allowing operators of CCTV cameras to order offenders to stop what they were doing, ranging from ordering subjects to pick up their rubbish and put it in a bin to ordering groups of vandals to disperse. In 2005, Ray Mallon, the mayor and former senior police officer of Middlesbrough implemented "Talking CCTV" in his area.

Other towns have had such cameras installed. In 2007 several of the devices were installed in Bridlington town centre, East Riding of Yorkshire.

Countermeasures 
Due to the widespread implementation of surveillance cameras, glasses are being built which can defeat CCTV cameras. In December 2016 a form of anti-CCTV and facial recognition sunglasses called 'reflectacles' were invented by a custom-spectacle-craftsman based in Chicago named Scott Urban. They reflect infrared and, optionally, visible light which makes the user's face a white blur to cameras. The project easily surpassed its funding goal of $28,000 and reflectacles became commercially available in June 2017.

See also 

 Artificial intelligence for video surveillance
 Bugging
 "CATV" as cable television—not to be confused with CCTV
 Closed-circuit television camera
 Day and night camera
 Digital video recorder
 Documentary practice
 Eye in the sky (camera)
 Fake security camera
 INDECT
 Information Awareness Office
 IP camera
 Motion (surveillance software)
 Optic Nerve (GCHQ)
 Physical security
 Physical security information management (PSIM)
 Privacy International
 Security operations center
 Security smoke
 Shodan (website)
 Smart camera
 Smart city
 Sousveillance (inverse surveillance)
 Super recognisers
 Surveillance
 Telescreen
 The Convention on Modern Liberty
 TV Network Protocol
 Under vehicle inspection
 Video analytics
 Video evidence
 Videotelephony
 Washington County Closed-Circuit Educational Television Project
 Webcam
 Smart Home
 Surveillance Drone
 IoT

Notes

References

Further reading

 
 
 
  
 
 Wei Qi Yan (2019). Introduction to Intelligent Surveillance: Surveillance Data Capture, Transmission, and Analytics, Springer London.

External links

Assessing the Impact of CCTV, a UK Home office study on the effectiveness of closed-circuit television

Applications of computer vision
Assistive technology
Crime prevention
Law enforcement techniques
Physical security
Public safety
Security engineering
Security technology
Surveillance
Video surveillance
Video
Warning systems
Telecommunications-related introductions in 1942